Syarhey Kuznyatsow (born 3 November 1979) is a Belarusian professional football coach and former player.

Honours
Belarusian Premier League champion: 1999

External links
 
 

1979 births
Living people
Footballers from Minsk
Belarusian footballers
Belarusian expatriate footballers
Association football midfielders
FC BATE Borisov players
FC Darida Minsk Raion players
FC Naftan Novopolotsk players
FC Metalist Kharkiv players
FC Metalist-2 Kharkiv players
SC Tavriya Simferopol players
FC Arsenal Kyiv players
FC Granit Mikashevichi players
FC Dynamo Brest players
FC Bucha players
FC Kolos Kovalivka players
Ukrainian Premier League players
Ukrainian First League players
Ukrainian Second League players
Ukrainian Amateur Football Championship players
Expatriate footballers in Ukraine
Belarusian expatriate sportspeople in Ukraine
Belarusian football managers
Belarusian expatriate football managers
Expatriate football managers in Ukraine
Expatriate football managers in Lithuania
FC Kolos Kovalivka managers
Ukrainian Premier League managers